Nicole Woolsey Biggart is a Research Professor and Professor Emerita and was the Jerome J. and Elsie Suran Chair in Technology Management at the University of California, Davis from 2002 until 2010.  She received her Ph.D. in economic sociology from the University of California, Berkeley with a dissertation entitled The Magic Circle: A Study of Personal Staffs in the Administrations of Governors Ronald Reagan and Jerry Brown,  M.A. in sociology from the University of California, Davis, and a B.A. in communication from Simmons College.

Professor Biggart was Dean of the UC Davis Graduate School of Management and was a founding faculty member of the school.

References

University of California, Davis faculty
 UC Berkeley College of Letters and Science alumni
Living people
Year of birth missing (living people)
Fellows of the American Association for the Advancement of Science
University of California, Davis alumni
Simmons University alumni